Craddock is a surname of Welsh origin (the name Caradog means "beloved, amiable"). Notable people with the surname include:

Bantz J. Craddock, U.S. general
Barbara Craddock, U.S. dancer and choreographer
Billy "Crash" Craddock, U.S. country singer
Brad Craddock, American footballer
Charles Egbert Craddock, pen name of Mary N. Murfree (1850–1922), a U.S. fiction writer
Charlotte Craddock, English field hockey player
Darren Craddock, English footballer
DeWayne Craddock, perpetrator of the 2019 Virginia Beach shooting
Fred Craddock, Christian minister
Ian Craddock, British engineer
Jody Craddock, English footballer
John D. Craddock, U.S. Representative from Kentucky, USA
Lawson Craddock, American cyclist
Linda Craddock (b. 1952), Canadian visual artist
Matthew Craddock, first governor of the Massachusetts Bay Company
Moe Craddock, instrumental in the incorporation of Glenn Heights, Texas
Tom Craddock, English footballer
Vincent Eugene Craddock (1935–1971), better known as Gene Vincent, an American musician and member of the Rock and Roll and Rockabilly halls of fame
William J. Craddock, U.S. author

See also
Caradec
Cradock
Craddock

References

Welsh-language surnames